The Roller Coaster is a steel roller coaster located Papéa Parc amusement park in Yvré-l'Evêque, France, formerly known as Beaver Land Mine Ride at Geauga Lake in Aurora, Ohio. It was a standard production model junior coaster from Zierer. It is known for having the longest train of any coaster (with 20 two-seat cars) at Papea Parc, and it is also the only coaster in the park to complete a full circuit twice while in operation. 

This ride was installed as "Roadrunner Express" during the transition to Six Flags Ohio in 2000 and was one of three identical coasters installed in Six Flags parks that year. The other two are at Six Flags New England and Six Flags Discovery Kingdom.

In March 2004, Six Flags sold Worlds of Adventure to Cedar Fair for $145 million USD. Subsequently, the Geauga Lake name was restored to the park after temporarily being retired after 113 years. Any references to Looney Tunes and DC Comics characters had to be removed from the park before opening day, since Cedar Fair did not own the licensing rights to either of them. This change affected several rides and attractions, including Roadrunner Express. Cedar Fair renamed the coaster to Beaver Land Mine Ride.  

On 16 September 2007, the Cedar Fair transitioned Geauga Lake from a operating as a traditional amusement park to operating solely as a waterpark, Wildwater Kingdom, and rides from the amusement park side began to be relocated to other theme parks. Beaver Land Mine Ride was sold to the Papéa Parc amusement park in Yvré-l'Évêque, France, where it has operated since as The Roller Coaster.

External links
Le Roller Coaster
Beaver Land Mine Ride - Geauga Lake: Today and Forever

Roller coasters introduced in 2000
Roller coasters operated by Cedar Fair
Geauga Lake
Former roller coasters in Ohio
Amusement rides that closed in 2007